Krępa may refer to:

Krępa, Lower Silesian Voivodeship (south-west Poland)
Krępa, Kuyavian-Pomeranian Voivodeship (north-central Poland)
Krępa, Lublin Voivodeship (east Poland)
Krępa, Łowicz County in Łódź Voivodeship (central Poland)
Krępa, Poddębice County in Łódź Voivodeship (central Poland)
Krępa, Radomsko County in Łódź Voivodeship (central Poland)
Krępa, Lesser Poland Voivodeship (south Poland)
Krępa, Świętokrzyskie Voivodeship (south-central Poland)
Krępa, Mława County in Masovian Voivodeship (east-central Poland)
Krępa, Piaseczno County in Masovian Voivodeship (east-central Poland)
Krępa, Greater Poland Voivodeship (west-central Poland)
Krępa, Lubusz Voivodeship (west Poland)
Krępa, West Pomeranian Voivodeship (north-west Poland)